L. sibirica  may refer to:
 Larix sibirica, the Siberian or Russian larch, a frost-hardy tree species native to western Russia
 Ligularia sibirica, a perennial herbaceous plant species native to fens and damp grassy meadows in Siberia, Central and Eastern Europe

See also
 Sibirica